So You Think You Can Dance is a dance reality show and competition aired on 8TV. Premiered on 5 April 2007, it is based on the original United States version of the same name. It has a similar premise to the American Idol series of singing competitions, with nationwide auditions leading to the discovery of the next big star.

The organizers of So You Think You Can Dance held one audition in Kuala Lumpur. The contestants that are picked go through callbacks and the Top 20 perform on a live show. This follows a weekly elimination hereafter. The Malaysian version of So You Think You Can Dance had completed its inaugural season with Muhammad Haslam Abdul Rahman Rubaee as the champion.

The show was hosted by Juliana Ibrahim and Jehan Miskin; the latter only joined the cast since episode 9.

Casts

Host
 Juliana Ibrahim – actress in Realiti and Impian Illyana, appeared in SYTYCD since Episode 1
 Jehan Miskin – actor and TV host, appeared in SYTYCD since Episode 9

Judges

Permanent
 Pat Ibrahim – choreographer of Puteri Gunung Ledang the Musical
 Ramli Ibrahim – dance choreographer and artistic director of Sutra Dance Theatre
 Judimar Hernandez – Venezuela-born choreographer and The Actors Studio performer

Stylist
Peter lum

Guests
 Yannus Sufandi – Stage Performer for international artists and support acts such as ARIA'S Awards (Australian Music Awards), RUMBA 2002 Aust Tour, Fatman Scoop Promo Tour, Pharrell Promo Tour and Sugababes Music Videos, and many more, choreographer for TV commercials Samsung, 7UP, etc.Appeared in Callbacks, Boot Camp, Top 12, Top 8 and Top 6 Competitions Also as the Artistic Director/Choreographer of the Show
 Jeff Thacker – executive producer of So You Think You Can Dance (America)Appeared in Auditions
 Linda Jasmine – ex-choreographer for Akademi FantasiaAppeared in Week 1 of Competitions
 Tiara Jacquelina – star of Puteri Gunung Ledang (the film and musical)Appeared in Weeks 2 and 3 of Competitions
Note: Juliana, Pat and Ramli Ibrahim are not related to each other.

Choreographers
The following is the list of choreographers whose involvement in the competition are as shown on TV, followed by their specialties.
 Azwa – Malaysian Contemporary
 Patricia Calzadilla – Salsa, Latin dances
 Choo Teng Kuang – Contemporary
 Farah Sulaiman – Jazz
 Fasilito – Salsa
 Luisa Lau – paso doble, jive, samba
 Amy Len – Chinese contemporary
 Loh Poh Choo – Contemporary
 William Lor – Paso doble, jive
 Umesh Shetty – Indian contemporary
 Manuela Oliveira – Hip-hop, street jazz, dancehall, Also the Artistic Director
 Peter Ong – Latin dances
 Ichiro and Dawn Uchida – Funk
 Michael Xavier Voon – Broadway
 Yannus Sufandi – Hip-hop, Dancehall, Also the Artistic Director

Season 1

The Top 20 Contestants

Auditions (aired 5 April 2007)
Auditions were held on 16 and 17 March the same year, with Pat, Judimar and guest Jeff Thacker to judge the participants' dancing skills. Participants who displayed a good degree of potential to them would be recalled to the Callbacks (if their skills are debatable) or qualify directly to the Boot Camp (if they greatly impressed the judges during the auditions).

Callbacks (aired 12 April 2007)
Out of 500 people taking part in the two days of preliminary auditions, only seven participants were directly headed to the Boot Camp while 80 others were given an extra test in the Callbacks. Pat Ibrahim and Judimar Hernandez returned as judges, this time alongside two other faces, Yannus Sufandi and Ramli Ibrahim. After going through versatility and pairing-up tests, only 40 of them qualified to the Boot Camp – 20 male and 20 female, inclusive of the seven who qualified directly from the auditions.

Boot Camp (aired 19 April 2007)
The Top 40 were tested on their versatility in various dances and cohesiveness in the competition. The first day of Boot Camp saw the Top 40 practising four different genres of dance under the guide of four choreographers: Hip-hop (Yannus Sufandi), Contemporary (Umesh Nair), Street Jazz (Manuela Oliveira), and Salsa (Patricia Calzadilla). After each of the four choreography sessions they needed to perform what they had learnt from it.

The second day witnessed the contestants doing solo performances, attempting to display "a different side" of theirs to impress the judges for entering the Top 20. At the nightfall of the second day, the judges announced the Top 20.

A notable scene in the aftermath of the results involved one of the rejected ones who broke down to tears, lamenting to have failed to fulfil the last wish of a best friend whom he said as to "be dying" that night.

Competition (aired 3 May 2007 onwards)
Competitions are broadcast live from Ruums KL on Thursdays from 9.30pm (GMT+8). In each of these nights, contestants perform in pairs (each of one male and one female) in Round 1 to impress the judges as well as the audience in the club and at home.

The judges will select the four weakest performers (six in later episodes) to perform in solo within 30 seconds each in Round 2 to garner viewers' votes in order to remain in the competition. Unlike the American version, in which judges select the worst-performing pairs, in here the worst-performing individual contestants were selected.

Viewers are given about 20 minutes including the solo performances. After that, the show goes into a 15-minute break, in which a Quickie Dance Special is broadcast live from Sri Pentas and Ruums KL.

The one male and one female contestants with the lowest votes leave the competition.

The Grand Finale was scheduled to be held on 29 June, in Ruums KL.

Week 1 (3 May 2007)
A top 10 contestant from season 2 of the American version, Dmitry Chaplin made a special performance before the results were announced.
Round 1
Jo and Shake: Hip-hop
Nikki and Yuz: Malaysian contemporary
Noor and Alam: Contemporary
Orange and Vish: Salsa
Alice and Chris: Street jazz

Azzy and Jimmy: Contemporary
Becky and Dennis: Paso Doble
Brancy and Sean: Malaysian contemporary
Davina and Firul: Broadway
Sue and Isaac: Hip-hop

Round 2
Alice
Shake (eliminated)
Azzy (eliminated)
Vish

Week 2 (10 May 2007)

Round 1
Nikki and Yuz: Contemporary
Sue and Isaac: Hip-hop
Brancy and Sean: Sevillanas
Jo and Jimmy: Malaysian contemporary

Noor and Alam: Paso Doble
Orange and Vish: Salsa
Becky and Dennis: Jive
Davina and Firul: Jazz
Alice and Chris: Street jazz

Round 2
Davina (eliminated)
Sean (eliminated)
Alice
Chris

The contestants performed their first group performance before the announcement of Round 2 results, dancing Malaysian contemporary to the music of Mahaguru by KRU.

Week 3 (17 May 2007)

Round 1
Alice and Chris: Malaysian contemporary
Nikki and Yuz: Hip-hop
Noor and Alam: Contemporary
Brancy and Firul: Malaysian contemporary

Jo and Jimmy: Foxtrot
Becky and Dennis: Funk
Sue and Isaac: Samba
Orange and Vish: Dancehall

Round 2
Chris (eliminated)
Alice (eliminated)
Jimmy
Becky

Week 4 (24 May 2007)
This show witnessed the contestants' second group performance throughout the competition, which was performed at the beginning of the show.

Round 1
Orange and Vish: Malaysian contemporary
Nikki and Yuz: Broadway
Sue and Isaac: Contemporary

Becky and Dennis: Tango
Noor and Alam: Hip-hop
Brancy and Firul: Mambo
Jo and Jimmy: Pop

Round 2
Orange (eliminated)
Vish (eliminated)
Nikki
Isaac

Week 5 (aired 31 May 2007)
This week witnessed the addition of Jehan Miskin to complement Juliana as hosts of the show, the first themed night, Malaysiana, which dancers performed contemporary versions of Malaysian ethnic dances, and the judges' decision to have a Bottom 6 instead of a Bottom 4, citing the need to reflect "a fiercer competition".

Round 1
Becky and Dennis: Malay contemporary
Brancy and Firul: Chinese contemporary
Sue and Isaac: Indian contemporary
Noor and Alam: Chinese contemporary
Nikki and Yuz: Malay contemporary
Jo and Jimmy: Indian contemporary

Round 2
Isaac (eliminated)
Alam
Noor
Jimmy
Becky
Jo (eliminated)

Week 6 (aired 7 June 2007)
In this week, the couplings were reshuffled, i.e. each contestant has a new partner; and each couple performed two routines. The night was also noted by the judges as the worst of all the performance nights; only Noor and Yuz's second routine managed to impress them.

Round 1
Sue and Firul:
Street jazz
Indian contemporary
Brancy and Dennis:
Mambo
Hip-hop

Noor and Yuz
Rock and Roll
Malay contemporary
Nikki and Alam
Hip-hop
Salsa
Becky and Jimmy
Malay contemporary
Dancehall

Round 2
Brancy
Firul (eliminated)
Nikki
Dennis
Becky (eliminated)
Alam

Week 7 (aired 14 June 2007)

Round 1
Sue and Jimmy
Contemporary
Viennese Waltz
Brancy and Dennis
Street jazz
Samba

Noor and Yuz
Broadway
Malay contemporary
Nikki and Alam
Contemporary
Hip-hop

Round 2
Brancy
Jimmy (eliminated)
Nikki (eliminated)
Noor
Alam
Dennis

Week 8 (aired 21 June 2007)
In the semi-final show, the voting lines were opened from the beginning of the show and contestants could choose their choreographers for their solo routine. The judges gave all six of them positive reviews on their performances. After the elimination was announced, the lines were re-opened for the grand finals.

Round 1
Sue and Alam – Contemporary
Brancy and Dennis – Samba
Noor and Yuz: Latin ?

Round 2
Sue: Malay contemporary
Alam: Contemporary
Dennis: Hip-hop
Brancy: Contemporary
Yuz: Indian contemporary (eliminated)
Noor: Contemporary (eliminated)

Grand Finals (aired 29 June 2007)
The night began with the resurfacing of memories of the competition as told by the judges and recap footages taken throughout the competition. The Top 4, Alam, Dennis, Sue and Brancy, performed two pair routines (including the first time there were same-gender pairs) and one solo each. The Grand Finals was also graced by the other 16 contestants who were eliminated in the previous eight weeks, as well as guest performances by a jig troupe choreographed by Judimar Hernandez, Joe Flizzow and the Kartel, and Reshmonu and his bhangra drummers.

At 10.20pm, Alam was declared Malaysia's Best Dancer, clinching RM50,000 cash and a role in a theatre project by Tiara Jacquelina.

Round 1
Dennis and Alam – Hip-hop
Sue and Brancy – Street jazz
Sue and Dennis – Foxtrot
Brancy and Alam – Malay contemporary

Round 2
Alam – Breakdancing
Dennis – Paso Doble
Sue – Ballet/Tango
Brancy – Broadway jazz

External links
So You Think You Can Dance official website
SYTYCD Malaysia Forum

2007 Malaysian television seasons
Season 01